Maliattha ritsemae is a moth of the family Noctuidae. It was described by Samuel Constantinus Snellen van Vollenhoven in 1880. It is found on Sulawesi, Ambon Island, as well northern Australia and New Hebrides.

The wingspan is about 20 mm. Adults have white forewings with two brown bands. The hindwings are pale brown with darker margins.

The larvae feed on Brachiaria mutica.

References

Moths described in 1880
Eustrotiinae